In Greek mythology, Philomache or Phylomache (Ancient Greek: Φυλομάχην) was an Minyan princess who became a queen of Iolcus.

Family 
Phylomache was the daughter of King Amphion of Orchomenus and thus sister to Chloris, wife of Neleus. She was named as the wife of Pelias, king of Iolcus and mother of Acastus, Pisidice, Pelopia, Hippothoe and Alcestis. But other sources say that the wife of Pelias and the mother of these children was the daughter of Bias named Anaxibia or Alphesiboea.

Mythology 
The only account that mentioned Phylomache was that of Apollodorus' Bibliotheca:

Notes

References 

 Apollodorus, The Library with an English Translation by Sir James George Frazer, F.B.A., F.R.S. in 2 Volumes, Cambridge, MA, Harvard University Press; London, William Heinemann Ltd. 1921. . Online version at the Perseus Digital Library. Greek text available from the same website.
 Theocritus, Idylls from The Greek Bucolic Poets translated by Edmonds, J M. Loeb Classical Library Volume 28. Cambridge, MA. Harvard Univserity Press. 1912. Online version at theoi.com
 Theocritus, Idylls edited by R. J. Cholmeley, M.A. London. George Bell & Sons. 1901. Greek text available at the Perseus Digital Library.

Princesses in Greek mythology
Queens in Greek mythology
Minyan characters in Greek mythology
Characters from Iolcus